This is a list of cricketers born outside England who have represented England's cricket team at Test, One Day International, or T20I level.

The country of birth is the only criterion applied; therefore, some of the players below may have very little relationship with the country of their birth, while others were born and bred in that particular country.

Elsewhere, other England internationals may be associated with a country but are not listed below because they were actually born in England. For example, Matthew Maynard, who is often listed as a Welsh cricketer because of his links with Anglesey
and Glamorgan, was born in Oldham, Lancashire.

Countries of birth are listed under their current names and according to their current borders to avoid possible confusion. Therefore, players born in what is now Zimbabwe are listed as such, regardless of whether they were born in Rhodesia, Southern Rhodesia or Zimbabwe. Similarly, Neal Radford was born in Luanshya in modern-day Zambia and is therefore listed under that country, although at the time Luanshya was part of the short-lived protectorate of Northern Rhodesia. Finally, Joseph McMaster is listed under Northern Ireland although his birthplace, County Down, was then part of Ireland.

Players born in seven Caribbean nations (Barbados, Guyana, Jamaica, Trinidad and Tobago, St Vincent and the Grenadines, Dominica and St Kitts and Nevis) have played for England. Combining these countries in the tradition of the West Indies cricket team would give a total of 14 players.

In recent years, the England team has been perceived to benefit hugely from players born in South Africa. Since Andrew Strauss made his ODI debut in 2003, twelve other South African-born players have played international cricket for England. 

After England won the World Cup final in 2019, references were made to the "diverse" nature of the team, which included four foreign-born players in the starting eleven: Eoin Morgan, Jason Roy, Ben Stokes and Jofra Archer.

As of December 17 2022, 111 players born outside England have represented the national team, of a total of 761 players.

List

References

Lists of cricketers
International cricketers born outside of England